The McAlpine Locks and Dam are a set of locks and a hydroelectric dam at the Falls of the Ohio River at Louisville, Kentucky. The locks and their associated canal were the first major engineering project on the Ohio River, completed in 1830 as the Louisville and Portland Canal, designed to allow shipping traffic to navigate through the Falls of the Ohio.

History

From 1925 to 1927, the dam for generating hydroelectric power was added, and the locks were expanded, first by a private company and then by the U.S. Army Corps of Engineers. The hydroelectric plant at the time was the seventh largest hydroelectric plant in the United States.

The system was renamed the McAlpine Locks and Dam in 1960 in honor of William McAlpine, who was the only civilian to have ever served as district engineer for the Corps of Louisville. The average daily flow at McAlpine is 118,000 cubic feet per second (3,340 m³/s). The hydroelectric plant consists of eight turbine units with a net power generation capacity of 80,000 kilowatts.

In October 2003, McAlpine was designated a Historic Civil Engineering Landmark by the American Society of Civil Engineers.

The McAlpine locks underwent a 10-year, $278 million expansion project scheduled to be completed in 2008, but was completed in early 2009.

Ownership
The hydroelectric plant is owned and operated by Louisville Gas & Electric, a subsidiary of PPL Corporation while the locks are operated by the Army Corps of Engineers.

See also

 List of crossings of the Ohio River
 List of locks and dams of the Ohio River
 Transportation in Louisville, Kentucky
 List of attractions and events in the Louisville metropolitan area

Gallery

External links
LG&E Plants
McAlpine Locks and Dam 2007 version from Wayback Machine
McAlpine Locks and Dam from U.S. Army Corps of Engineers. Retrieved 29 April 2017
McAlpine Locks and Dam fact sheet from U.S. Army Corps of Engineers. Retrieved 29 April 2017
History of navigation development on the Ohio River from U.S. Army Corps of Engineers. Retrieved 29 April 2017
 Provides historical context for McAlpine Locks and Dam; good bibliography.

Transport infrastructure completed in 1830
Dams completed in 1927 
Energy infrastructure completed in 1927
Transportation buildings and structures in Louisville, Kentucky
Buildings and structures in Louisville, Kentucky
Canals in Kentucky
Dams in Kentucky
Dams in Indiana
Dams on the Ohio River
Hydroelectric power plants in Kentucky
United States Army Corps of Engineers dams
1830 establishments in Kentucky
Locks of Kentucky
Locks of Indiana